Linda West is a Canadian administrator, activist and politician. She has been a candidate for the Conservative Party of Canada and the Progressive Conservative Party of Manitoba. She is also known for her involvements in several volunteering organizations like Rotary Club of Parry sound, Habitat for Humanity, Community Business and Development Centre, The Parry Sound Area Founders Circle etc. She received the Order of Parry Sound in 2020 for community services and supports during the COVID-19 pandemic. As on 2021, she is known for serving as the president of Rotary Club of Parry Sound.

Education

West has a Bachelor of Arts degree from Laurentian University and a Master of Business Administration specializing in Health Care from the University of Toronto.  She also holds a Ph.D. from Washington International University, an unaccredited institution incorporated in the British Virgin Islands.

Career

West was executive director of the James Bay General Hospital from 1992 to 1995, and of the Winnipeg River Health District from 1995 to 1997.  From 1997 to 2000, she was executive director of labour relations for Manitoba Health.  She has also been a health policy consultant for the Progressive Conservative Party of Manitoba, and has taught nursing and business at the University of Manitoba.

In 2003, West helped organize a conference in Winnipeg, Manitoba on the role of women in politics.  She received a Women of Distinction Award from the Winnipeg YMCA-YWCA in 2004, and was later chosen as the local director of Equal Voice, a group that promotes the increased participation of women in political life. West authored the Trends and Issues in Health Care. In 2006, she helped organize a rebuilding effort in New Orleans for Habitat For Humanity.

In July 2007, West was hired as executive director for employment services in the Regina Qu’Appelle Health Region's Human Resources Department.  She was named acting vice-president of Human Resources in August of the same year, and became vice-president in December.  West left employment with the Regina Qu’Appelle Health Region on 21 February 2008.  West also became vice-president of Human Resources with a recruitment agency that provides Canadian placements to migrant workers from the Philippines, in 2007.  She argued in 2008 that Canada needs overseas recruitment to counter a domestic labour shortage. West co-founded Actyl Group, a human resource recruitment agency. She serves as the company president.

West returned to the University of Manitoba in 2015 to teach in the Asper School of Business.

Activist and political candidate

West first ran for public office in the 2003 provincial election, as a candidate of the Progressive Conservative Party. She initially sought the party's nomination for Riel, but lost to former Member of the Legislative Assembly Shirley Render at a nomination meeting in late 2002. During the nomination contest, one PC insider suggested that West's views on private health care would be a liability for the party.

West subsequently convened a public meeting on Manitoba's physician shortage, which was held at Winnipeg's Transcona Inn in early 2003.  During the question and answer session, she announced that she was considering a candidacy in the division of Radission. The political overtones of this meeting were noted in a newspaper report, though West denied that it had been called for political purposes.  She won the Radisson nomination, but lost to New Democratic Party candidate Bidhu Jha in the general election.

The Manitoba Nurses' Union criticized West in late 2003, after she led a group of her own fourth-year undergraduate students in a rally outside the provincial legislature supporting an on-the-job training program.  It was alleged that the students received a portion of their grade for participating in the rally, but West said that her students were taught to review both sides of the issue.

West was a supporter of the Progressive Conservative Party of Canada at the federal level, and supported its merger with the more right-wing Canadian Alliance to create the Conservative Party of Canada in 2003.  She ran for the new party in the 2006 federal election, and finished second against New Democratic Party incumbent Bill Blaikie in Elmwood—Transcona. West's Ph.D. credentials became a source of controversy during the 2006 federal election because Washington International University is an institution that is licensed but not accredited by any educational oversight body in Canada or the United States of America.

West challenged Bidhu Jha a second time in the 2007 provincial election, initially centering her campaign around local opposition to a hog-processing plant planned for construction in the Radisson area.  The NDP government withdrew its support for the project during the election, and indicated that the plant would not be built.  Some NDP insiders nevertheless expressed concern that their early support for the unpopular project had made the seat vulnerable.  On election day, however, Jha defeated West by an increased margin.

West received the Order of Parry Sound for the year 2020 owing to her community services and support during the COVID-19 pandemic specifically for the Rotary Club grocery program that offered convenient grocery shopping during the difficult situation.

Health care
West has written several articles calling for Manitoba and Canada to develop new strategic plans for health care delivery.  She supports the Canada Health Act.

West and provincial Health Minister Dave Chomiak engaged in a public controversy over health care strategies in late 2001 and early 2002.  In the same period, West argued that Manitobans should pay health-care premiums instead of paying for health expenses through general taxation.

West returned to writing opinion pieces on Canada's health-care system after the 2003 election.  She reiterated her support for publicly funded private clinics, and criticized the provincial government's approach to the issue.  She was also a vocal opponent of Winnipeg Mayor Glen Murray's tax policies, which she spoke against at several public meetings.

Electoral record

All electoral information is taken from Elections Canada and Elections Manitoba. Provincial expenditures refer to candidate expenses. Italicized expenditures refer to submitted totals, and are presented when the final reviewed totals are not available.

References

Conservative Party of Canada candidates for the Canadian House of Commons
Progressive Conservative Party of Manitoba candidates in Manitoba provincial elections
People using unaccredited degrees
Canadian women in federal politics
Year of birth missing (living people)
Living people
Women in Manitoba politics
21st-century Canadian women politicians